Lena Therese Rådström Baastad, née Larsson, (born 4 April 1974) is a Swedish politician of the Social Democratic Party who served as Secretary-General of the Social Democratic Party from 2016 to 2021. She previously served as Mayor of Örebro Municipality from 2011 to 2016.

During the spring of 2016, between serving as Mayor and before being elected Secretary-General, Rådström Baastad worked as a consultant at Gaia Leadership. She was Member of the Riksdag, representing Örebro County, from September 2018 until her resignation in September 2021.

References

People from Örebro
Living people
1974 births
Mayors of places in Sweden
Members of the Riksdag 2018–2022
Women members of the Riksdag
Members of the Riksdag from the Social Democrats
21st-century Swedish women politicians